The Tallulah Men's Club Building, also known as the Tallulah Club, is a two-story brick Colonial Revival building that was built in c.1929.  It was listed on the National Register of Historic Places on November 7, 1991.

It has a four-column portico.  It is located across from the Madison Parish courthouse.

See also
Tallulah Book Club Building, NRHP-listed library and women's clubhouse
National Register of Historic Places listings in Madison Parish, Louisiana

References

Colonial Revival architecture in Louisiana
Buildings and structures completed in 1929
Buildings and structures in Madison Parish, Louisiana
Clubhouses in Louisiana
Clubhouses on the National Register of Historic Places in Louisiana
Men's club buildings
National Register of Historic Places in Madison Parish, Louisiana